Léon Fauché (born Briey (Meurthe-et-Moselle); 1868–1950) was a French painter who in 1901, with Anquetin, organised the Salon des Refusés at the Pavillon des Arts Décoratifs, and founded the Association The Studio (L'Atelier) with Armand Point.

Fauché studied at the École des Beaux-Arts in Nancy and then with Aimé Morot and Chartran in Paris. He exhibited at the Salon des Indépendants with Toulouse-Lautrec, Dethomas and Anquetin. He also showed his work at the Salon of the Société Nationale des Beaux-Arts and The Volpini Exhibition, 1889.

References

1868 births
1950 deaths
19th-century French painters
People from Briey
20th-century French painters